Ellough Park Raceway is a kart racing track in Ellough in the English county of Suffolk. It is primarily used for kart racing as it is a fast, but tight and twisty circuit.

The track, which is fully floodlit, has existed on the old Ellough Airfield since the early 1960s, but was not fully developed until 2000, when ex-Formula 1 driver Jackie Oliver opened the circuit. The authorities at the circuit extended it in 2007, from 800m to just over 1000m to make it more suitable for other forms of kart and minimoto racing. The circuit was extended further in 2010 to incorporate a new pits complex and add extra paddock space for hosting the Formula Kart Stars championship. 

In 2022 the current owner of the circuit (Simon Francis) further extended the track.  There is now a 190m straight which incorporates a breath taking and very physical chicane as well as 180 degree banked curve taken at full speed.   The circuit is now over 1100m and is probably one the most demanding  within the UK.

Today, the track plays host to national and local kart championships, as well as charity events, stag parties and corporate days which use the arrive and drive facilities at the track. A small clubhouse, shop and changing facilities are available.

Park Champions

Open Grand Prix

Overall Champion

2002 - Steve English
2003 - Joe Larkin
2004 - Matt Bond
2005 - Steve English
2006 - Tony Rumball
2007 - Mel Paul

2008 - Andy Horne
2009 - Andy Horne
2010 - James Barnes
2011 - Guy Newstead
2012 - Alex Ready
2013 - Alex Ready

2014 - Tom Griffiths
2015 - Tom Griffiths
2016 - Tom Griffiths
2017 - Brett Wheatley
2018 - Brett Wheatley
2019 - Brett Wheatley

Heavyweight Champion

2012 - Lee Henderson

2013 - Lee Henderson

2014 - Lee Henderson

Rookie of the Year

2011 - Luke Cousins
2012 - Ian Howes

2013 - Dan Walker

2014 - James Lane

Open Endurance
Champion

2003 - Gill Building (Nick Gill, Andrew Gill)
2004 - Team Max Downforce (Matt Bond, Derek Flegg, Tom Ashton)
2005 - Red Dot (Tom Morfoot, Tony Rumball)
2006 - Brown Streak (Tony Rumball, Steve English, Heidi Bacon)
2011 - Pulham Pigs (Sinclair Glover, Steve Algar, Jerry Scoggins)
2012 - Ninpo (Ian Sandell, James Pearce)

2013 - GP Exiles (Alex Ready, Chris Lodge, Alex Vingoe)
2014 - Pulham Pigs (Sinclair Glover, Steve Algar, Jerry Scoggins)
2015 - Bro Racing (Daniel Walker, Luke Walker, Phillip Large, Tom Griffiths)
2016 - David & Co
2017 - David & Co
2022 - MagnaKarting (Josh Grout, Paul Gaston)

Car Trade Challenge
Champion

2006 - Wrights Mazda Norwich
2007 - Team Lind BMW

2008 - Wrights Mazda Norwich
2009 - Wrights Mazda Norwich

2010 - Glover Brothers

Junior League
Champion

2003 - Olly Larkin
2004 - Damien Swan
2005 - Tom Morfoot
2006 - Steven Hindry
2007 - Steven Hindry
2007 - Chris Long
2008 Winter - Jamie Cummings

2008 - Jamie Cummings
2009 Winter - Kieran Rudrum
2009 - Jake Dewbery
2010 Winter - Kieran Rudrum
2010 - Ryan Cummings
2011 Winter - Jak Warner
2011 - Harry Holdbrook

2012 Winter - Alex Ready
2012 - Alex Ready
2013 Winter - Jack Tritton
2013 - Georgie Whitbread
2014 Winter - Thomas Fousler
2014 - Jack Tritton
2015 Winter - Robert Welham
2015 - Robert Welham

Cadet League
Champion

2004 - Tom Morfoot
2005 - Tom Sykes
2006 - Tom Sykes
2007 - Alex Vingoe
2008 Winter - Craig Cummings
2008 - Jesse Chamberlain

2009 Winter -  Craig Cummings
2009 - Arnold Lincoln
2010 Winter - Henry Dixon
2010 - Craig Cummings
2011 Winter - Craig Cummings

2011 - Sam Fitzpatrick
2012 Winter -  Craig Cummings
2012 - Jason Hutton
2013 Winter - Jason Hutton
2013 - Thomas Foulser

Pro-Kart Endurance
Champions

2001 - Focus
2002 - Voodoo
2003 - Rivett Motors

2004 - Rivett Motors
2005 - Sonic Deaf Monkeys
2006 - Kart'orse (Carl Eweleit, Ian Sandell)

2007 - Rivett Motors (Martyn Rivett, Chris Bond)
2009 - Q Racing (Kyle Cumbers, Sean Curtis)

Pro-Kart Sprint Series (Formally 'Boat Boys')
Champions

2008 Winter - Tim Lewis
2008 Spring - Pete Mantripp
2008 Summer - Rob Mayo
2008 Autumn - Simon Francis
2008 Overall - Chris Wright
2009 Winter - Pete Mantripp
2009 Spring - Simon Francis
2009 Summer - Jonathan Lewis

2009 Winter - Simon Francis
2009 Overall - Simon Francis
2010 Winter - Darren Houghton
2010 Spring - Alex Wright
2010 Summer - Jay Austin
2010 Winter - Roger Smith
2010 Overall - Roger Smith
2011 Winter - Shaun Reeve

2011 Overall - Shaun Reeve
2011 Clubman - Pete Bennett
2012 Overall - Shaun Reeve
2012 Clubman - Brenden Stockdale
2013 Overall - Alex Wright
2013 Clubman - Hadleigh Wakefield

All Stars Julian Durance Memorial Shield
The Ellough Park 'All Stars' competition was first set up in 2005 for current and past stars of the open Grand Prix series to compete for a one-off trophy. The inaugural event was won by Matt Bond from pole position. Tony Rumball and Aaron Bessey completed the podium.

The event was originally meant to be held every four years but returned in 2008 and has run every year since then. Matt Bond retained his title in 2008, to date his last appearance at Ellough Park. Steve English had taken pole position ahead of Steve Armstrong but the two drivers collided at turn 1, dropping them to the tail of the field. James Barnes and Andy Horne completed the podium.

For 2009, drivers from other leagues were granted entries for the first time, adding diversity to the field. In atrocious conditions, Steve English picked up his maiden ‘All-Stars’ title. Tony Rumball claimed second, having led most of the final with James Barnes in third. Andy Horne had started on pole but slipped back to tenth at the finish.  2010 saw another new champion in Tony Rumball, who was outstanding in the tricky conditions. Steve English and James Barnes rounded out the podium finishers.

The 'All-Stars' was renamed to 'Julian Durance Memorial Shield' in 2011 in memory of the circuit mechanic and former British Superkart racer who died in late 2010 at the age of 40. The 2011 race was run with a new ranking points system with the number one seed going to James Barnes. The event was won by the 23rd seed Ollie Thorn at his first attempt. Guy Newstead and Luke Dickerson also claimed their first ‘All-Stars’ podium finishes.

2012 produced the most competitive running of the meeting since its inception. Ollie Thorn entered as number one seed but the victory went the way of debutant Alex Ready, who had a run of success throughout the season also claiming the Open Grand Prix and Junior League titles. Chris Trott took the runner-up spot with Craig Pollard third after a spirited fightback when he spun to the tail of the field on lap one.

References

External links
Ellough Park Raceway

Motorsport venues in England
Waveney District